Brimmer is a surname. Notable people with the surname include:

Andrew Brimmer (1926–2012), economist, academic, and business leader
Clarence Addison Brimmer Jr. (1922–2014), United States federal judge
David Brimmer, American voice actor and fight choreographer
Esther Brimmer, U.S. Assistant Secretary of State for International Organizations
Gabriela Brimmer (1947–2000), Mexican writer and activist for persons with disabilities
Jake Brimmer (born 1998), Australian footballer
Martin Brimmer, American politician and the ninth mayor of Boston, Massachusetts from 1843 to 1844
Philip A. Brimmer (born 1959), United States federal judge

See also
"The Broad Black Brimmer", Irish Republican folk song written by Noel Nagle of the Wolfe Tones